Ataşehir Belediyespor is a Turkish sports club based in the Ataşehir district of Istanbul. It is known for its women's football team that won the Turkish League championship in 2011, the fourth year of its existence. They defended their title successfully in 2012.

History 
The women's team was founded as a high school team, Ümraniye Mevlana Lisesi SK, in 2007. The team was promoted at the end of their first season in the Women's Regional League to the Women's Second League. The next season, they were able to ascend to the Women's First League. The girls became champion in the Junior Women's League also the same year. Representing Turkey at the World Intercollegiate Football Championship held in Antalya, the high school team placed seventh.

The club with financial problems was purchased by the newly established Ataşehir Municipality. The club was renamed Ateşehir Belediyesi Spor Kulübü in the summer of 2009. They first participated in the national league season 2009–10, ending the season in third place.

In the 2010–11 season, the team won the championship three weeks before the end. The women's team represented Turkey in the 2011–12 UEFA Women's Champions League, and also in the 2012–13 UEFA Women's Champions League.

Ataşehir Belediyespor competed in the Group 4 of the qualifying round of the 2011–12 UEFA Champions League, lost two and drew one match finishing at third place without advancing to the knockout stage. In the 2012–13 UEFA Champions League, they played in the Group 1, lost two matches and won one match that resulted in the third rank. They were not able to advance further again.

Ataşehir Belediyespor women finished the 2012–13 and 2013–14 seasons runner-up behind Konak Belediyespor. Even though Ataşehir Belediyespor finished the 2014–15 season undefeated and with the same point as Konak Belediyespor, they lost the play-off game and became again runner-up.

The team finished the 2015–16 season as runner-up fourth time in a row. In September 2016, the Turkish Football Federation imposed a penalty of six points due to the club's misleading that came in effect in the 2016–17 season.

In the 12th week of the 2017–18 league season, Ataşehir Belediyespor hosted their five-time consecutive league champion archrival Konak Belediyespor. Both teams were undefeated, Ataşehir Belediyespor was league leader with no goals conceded so far. The Istanbul-based team won the derby match 4–1, and kept so their rival at bay with five points difference, a consolation for the one goal conceded in the match.

Ataşehir Belediyespor became the 2017–18 League champion two matches before the league's end, regaining the title from Konak Belediyespor, who held the title five seasons in a row. This is the third title of the Istanbul-based team in their history.

Ataşehir Belediyespor took part in the Group 4 of the 018–19 UEFA Women's Champions League qualifying round held in Budapest, Hungary between 7–13 August 2018. They lost to the Czech team SK Slavia Praha, drew with the host team MTK Hungária FC and defeated KFF Mitrovica from Kosovo. They ranked third in the group, and failed so to advance to the Round of 32.

Ataşehir Belediyespor finished the 2018-19 First League season in the fourth place. They efaeted their arch rival Konak Belediyespor with 3-1 in the home match of the season's last round.

Stadium 
Ataşehir Belediyespor play their home matches at Yeni Sahra Stadium in Yenisahra neighborhood of Ataşehir district in Istanbul. Opened in 2008, the venue is owned by Istanbul Metropolitan Municipality and operated by Yeni Sahra Sports Club.

The stadium is illuminated for night matches. Its ground is covered by artificial turf. The venue offers a parking lot for up to 50 cars.

Statistics 

(1) Six penalty points had been deducted in the beginning of the season imposed by the Turkish Football Federation.
(2) Finished Gr. A 8th 
(3) Season in progress

Current squad 

Head coach:  Taner Öner

Former managers 
 Adnan Katip (2010–2011)
 Muharrem Uzun (2012–2013)
 Gürkan Çavdar (2013)
 Selma İzitaş (2013)
 Bahtiyar Topal (2009–2010, 2011–2012, 2013–2015)
 Ekrem Köse (2015–216)
 Murat Kaya (2016)
 Taner Öner (2016–2017)
 Şeref Aslan (2017)

International results

Notable former players 

Turkey national team members

Büşra Ahlatcı (2009–2015, 2016)
Nagehan Akşan  (2018–2019)
Merve Aladağ (2011–2015)
Elif Ataol (2018–2019)
Bilgesu Aydın (2012–2015)
Çiğdem Belci (2010–2015, 2016–2018)
Kübra Berber (2016–2019)
Ezgi Çağlar (2011–2015, 2017)
Sevgi Çınar (2017–2018)
Sevinç Çorlu (2009–2017)
Damla Demirdön (2010–2916)
Sibel Duman (2019)
Hanife Demiryol (2012–2015)
Lütfiye Ercimen (2010–2016)
Medine Erkan (2014–2016)
Esra Erol (2018)

Başak Ersoy (2010–2013)
Emine Ecem Esen (2014–2015)
Başak Gündoğdu (2014–2015)
Kader Hançar (2013–2017)
Fatma Kara (2014–2017)
Arzu Karabulut (2017–2018)
Seval Kıraç (2011–2017)
Beyza Kocatürk (2018–2019)
Safa Merve Nalçacı (2018)
Mevlüde Öztürk (2013–2015)
Reyhan Şeker (2010–2018)
Ebru Topçu (2017–2018)
Ece Türkoğlu (2017–2018)
Yağmur Uraz (2010–2013, 2016–2018)
Berna Yeniçeri (2017–2018)
Duygu Yılmaz (2010–2018)

Foreigners

 Anastasiya Kunitskaya (2019)
 Henriette Akaba (2018)
 Bibi Medoua (2014)
 Carine Yoh (2016)
 Tatiana Matveeva (2011–2013)
 Nino Pasikashvili (2016–2017)
 Nino Sutidze (2016–2018)
 Khatia Tchkonia (2017)

 Ijeoma Queenth Daniels (2015–2016)
 Onome Ebi (2011–2013)
 Desire Oparanozie (2014)
 Esther Sunday (2018)
 Tetyana Kozyrenko (2018)
 Danesha Adams (2013)

Honours 
Turkish Women's First Football League
 Winners (3): 2010–11, 2011–12, 2017–18
 Runners-up (4): 2012–13, 2013–14, 2014–15, 2015–16
 Third places (1): 2016–17

Turkish Women's Second Football League
 Winners (1): 2008–09

Kit history

Squad history

References

External links 
Club's website
Turkish Football Federation website

 
Association football clubs established in 2007
2007 establishments in Turkey